Ebrahimabad (also Romanized as Ebrāhīmābād; also known as Ebrahim Abad Arzoo” eyeh and Ebrāhīmābād-e Arzu”īyeh) is a village in Soghan Rural District, Soghan District, Arzuiyeh County, Kerman Province, Iran. At the 2006 census, its population was 553.

References 

Populated places in Arzuiyeh County